Henry Seymour Courtney (born November 19, 1898 – December 11, 1954), was a professional baseball pitcher who played in the Major Leagues from – for the Washington Senators and Chicago White Sox.

He also played for the Washington Senators of the American Professional Football Association in 1921. That season signed with the football Senators for their November 20 game against a team from Clarksburg, West Virginia. However Clark Griffith, the owner of the baseball Senators, found out about Courtney moonlighting as a football player. Griffith ordered Courtney to stop playing football or risk finding himself without a job in baseball. Courtney gave up his football career and continued to focus only on baseball.

He was born in Asheville, North Carolina and died in Lyme, Connecticut.

External links

 GRIFF ORDERS COURTNEY TO CUT OUT FOOTBALL. (1921, November 27). The Washington Post (1877–1954),p. 22. Retrieved October 28, 2007, from ProQuest Historical Newspapers The Washington Post (1877–1991) database. (Document ID: 284298722).
 GALAXY OF GRID STARS IN PRO CONTEST TODAY (1921, November 27). The Washington Evening Star, p. 27. Retrieved June 12, 2016, from Evening Star Historical Archive.

1898 births
1954 deaths
Major League Baseball pitchers
Players of American football from North Carolina
Washington Senators (NFL) players
Washington Senators (1901–1960) players
Chicago White Sox players
Baseball players from North Carolina